Pyrausta californicalis, the California pyrausta moth, is a moth in the family Crambidae. It was described by Alpheus Spring Packard in 1873. It is found in North America, where it has been recorded from British Columbia to California.

The wingspan is about 13 mm. Adults have been recorded on wing from February to October.

The larvae feed on Mentha species.

Subspecies
Pyrausta californicalis californicalis 
Pyrausta californicalis sierranalis Munroe, 1976 (California)

References

Moths described in 1873
californicalis
Moths of North America